Richard Panek is an American popular science writer, columnist, and journalist who specializes in the topics of space, the universe, and gravity. He has published several books and has written articles for a number of news outlets and scientific organizations, including Scientific American, WIRED, New Scientist, and Discover.

Education and career
Born in Chicago, Panek received his Bachelor's of Science in journalism from Northwestern University's Medill School of Journalism and then a Master of Fine Arts in fiction from the University of Iowa's Iowa Writers' Workshop. His writing career began with his short fiction publications in papers like the Chicago Tribune and the New York Times. He went on to be a faculty adviser for Goddard College for their Master's Creative Writing program and also taught creative writing classes at Barnard College. He is also a frequent speaker and presenter at writing seminars for Johns Hopkins University.

In 2003, Panek donated the writing material for his first book, Waterloo Diamonds, to be a special collection at the University of Northern Iowa. He was one of three screenwriters for the giant-screen 2015 film Robots.

The Last Word On Nothing
Panek first joined the multi-author blog known as The Last Word On Nothing after being invited as a contributor by Ann Finkbeiner.

Awards and grants
For his early short fiction work in various newspapers, Panek was given the PEN Award for Syndicated Fiction in 1989, leading to him delivering readings of his work at the Library of Congress. In 2007, he received a Fellowship for science writing from the New York Foundation for the Arts. It was in 2008 that he received an additional fellowship for the same, but from the Guggenheim Foundation, along with a grant from the Antarctic Artists and Writers Program as awarded by the National Science Foundation. The American Institute of Physics gave Panek the 2012 Science Communication Award for Journalism after the publication of his book The 4 Percent Universe. The Goodreads Choice Awards for 2013 in Nonfiction was given to Panek and his co-author Temple Grandin for their book The Autistic Brain.

Bibliography

References

Living people
Iowa Writers' Workshop alumni
Medill School of Journalism alumni
Johns Hopkins University people
American science writers
Science journalists
21st-century American non-fiction writers
Discover (magazine) people
Scientific American people
Wired (magazine) people
Science bloggers
Writers from Chicago
Year of birth missing (living people)